Brittany Taylor Cameron (born December 3, 1986) is an American soccer goalkeeper who currently employed by Wake Forest as women's soccer assistant head coach.

Early life
Cameron grew up in Dublin, California and attended Dublin High School. During her senior year, she was team captain and received Contra Costa Times First Team, First Team All-Diablo Foothill Athletic League, and league Defensive MVP honors. As a junior,  she was voted to the First Team All Diablo Foothill Athletic League.

Cameron also played with youth club teams, Dublin High Energy and Pleasanton Rage.

University of San Diego
Cameron attended and played goalkeeper for the University of San Diego. During her senior year, she earned the West Coast Conference (WCC) Defender of the Year as a senior, becoming the second Torero ever to earn the distinction, while posting nine shutouts and a goals against average of 0.75.

Club career

Los Angeles Sol
In 2009, Cameron was selected as the 52nd pick overall in the 2009 WPS Draft by the Los Angeles Sol.

FC Gold Pride
After the Los Angeles Sol ceased operations in 2010, Cameron signed to FC Gold Pride.

Western New York Flash

In 2011, Cameron signed with the Western New York Flash.  The team won the 2011 WPS Championship after a rousing game against the Philadelphia Independence that ended in penalty kicks.

In 2012 after the WPS folded, Cameron signed again with the Western New York Flash this time in the Women's Premier Soccer League. The team went on to become league champions the same year.

Sky Blue FC
In February 2013, Cameron was selected by Sky Blue FC during the 2013 NWSL Supplemental Draft for the inaugural season of the National Women's Soccer League . After recording a shut-out against her former team, the Western New York Flash during the league's opening weekend, she was named NWSL Player of the Week. 2014 Nominee for Goalkeeper of the Year with the NWSL league Sky Blue FC and 2014 MVP Sky Blue FC.

Vegalta Sendai Ladies
In  August 2014, Cameron was loaned to Vegalta Sendai Ladies. Cameron has moved onto Japan for the entire 2015 season with Vegala Sendai. Won MVP Vegalta Sendai ladies 2016.

Coaching career
Cameron served as assistant coach at Niagara University, University of San Diego, Dartmouth College. San Francisco State Head Coach women's soccer 2019-2020, Currently Wake Forest Assistant Coach- Goalkeepers 2020-

References

External links

 Brittany Cameron profile at National Women's Soccer League
 Brittany Cameron profile at Sky Blue FC
 San Diego player profile
 Dartmouth assistant coach profile
 

Living people
1986 births
American women's soccer players
FC Gold Pride players
Los Angeles Sol players
Western New York Flash players
Women's Professional Soccer players
Soccer players from California
People from Dublin, California
NJ/NY Gotham FC players
National Women's Soccer League players
San Diego Toreros women's soccer players
University of San Diego alumni
Mynavi Vegalta Sendai Ladies players
American expatriate women's soccer players
Expatriate women's footballers in Japan
American expatriate sportspeople in Japan
Nadeshiko League players
Women's association football goalkeepers
African-American women's soccer players
21st-century African-American sportspeople
21st-century African-American women
20th-century African-American people
20th-century African-American women